Lepra may refer to:
 Lepra, a UK-based international charity
 Lepra, a genus of lichens